Baron Ashcombe, of Dorking in the County of Surrey and of Bodiam Castle in the County of Sussex, is a title in the Peerage of the United Kingdom. It was created in 1892 for the Conservative politician George Cubitt of Denbies House, Dorking, Surrey, who was continuously elected at elections over a 32-year period. He was the son of the architect Thomas Cubitt. Lord Ashcombe was succeeded by his son, the second Baron. He was a Conservative Member of Parliament and also served as Lord Lieutenant of Surrey. , the title is held by his kinsman, the fifth Baron, who succeeded his first cousin, once removed in 2013.

Rosalind Shand, daughter of the third Baron, was the mother of Queen Camilla.

Bodiam Castle in East Sussex was purchased by the first Baron in 1874 held until his trustees sold in 1916. The family seat was then at Denbies House until its demolition in the 1950s. The previous Lord Ashcombe, Henry, resided at Sudeley Castle, Gloucestershire, which is still held by his widow. The current Lord Ashcombe, Mark, lives at a private residence.

Barons Ashcombe (1892)
George Cubitt, 1st Baron Ashcombe (1828–1917)
Henry Cubitt, 2nd Baron Ashcombe (1867–1947)
Roland Calvert Cubitt, 3rd Baron Ashcombe (1899–1962)
Henry Edward Cubitt, 4th Baron Ashcombe (1924–2013)
 Mark Edward Cubitt, 5th Baron Ashcombe (b. 1964)

The heir apparent is the present holder's son, Richard Robin Alexander Cubitt (b. 1995).

Male-line family tree

Notes

References
Kidd, Charles, Williamson, David (editors). Debrett's Peerage and Baronetage (1990 edition). New York: St Martin's Press, 1990, 

Baronies in the Peerage of the United Kingdom
Noble titles created in 1892
Noble titles created for UK MPs